Marocaine Mosque is a mosque in the southern central part of Nouakchott, Mauritania. It is located south of Ould Abas Mosque, near the Marocaine Market and next to the Moroccan Cultural Centre.

See also
 Islam in Mauritania

References

Mosques in Mauritania
Buildings and structures in Nouakchott